Bellapiscis lesleyae, the mottled twister, is a triplefin of the family Tripterygiidae, commonly found around the coast of New Zealand in rock pools and down to depths of about 5 m in reef areas of broken rock.  Its length is up to 6 cm. The specific name of this blenny honours the New Zealand marine biologist Lesley Bolton who helped Hardy collect fishes in rockpools on the coast of New Zealand, including the type of this species.

References

lesleyae
Endemic marine fish of New Zealand
Fish described in 1987